Makrana is an urban city located at the centre of Rajasthan in Kuchaman City District. It also served as a tehsil headquarters, with 136 villages under its jurisdiction thus making it the largest tehsil in the district. The biggest village of Makrana tehsil by area is Modicharna. Makrana is known for the part it has played in building the Taj Mahal by supplying marble, craftsmen and stonemasons to build the iconic UNESCO world heritage centre. It is one of the developing cities in the state. The marble from the town Makrana which is known as Makrana Marble, gets the GHSR (Global Heritage Stone Resources) status from the IUGS.

Geography
It lies in the middle of the Aravalli Range, and these mountains are the source of its fame as a marble producer.

History
Makrana was a part of Jodhpur State in British India. It is home to some of the world's most renowned white marble sites, from which the Taj Mahal, Victoria Memorial of Kolkata, Birla Temple of Jaipur and Jain Temple of Dilwara in Southern Rajasthan were built. It is said that the 1800 artisans who settled Makrana originally came from a coastal strip in the south of Sindh and Balochistan (part of ancient Hindu civilization). Persian term muqarnas is after this town. Persians Islamic invader, when they came to India. They noticed these beautiful Hindu temples and stone carvings. They took some of these artisans along with them to built Islamic structures and destroyed most of the Hindu temples as anti-Islamic structures.

Economy 
The town is served by railroads and other forms of transportation, serving as a key junction between Jaipur, Parbatsar and Jodhpur.

Makrana is a large town in Nagaur district, with a deposit of 56 million tonnes of marble and 40,000 labourers working in 900 mines in the several ranges of the Aravallis. Makrana is the main centres of marble in Rajasthan. Calcitic in nature, Makrana marble is regarded as the oldest, and finest in quality.

The present rate of marble production from Makrana is 19.20 million tonnes per year with an annual revenue of rupees (INR) 20036 crore. Per capita income is INR 50,000, which is much higher than national average of INR 46,000. It is the richest municipality in Rajasthan.

Makrana is source of employment to more than 100,000 people from about 200 surrounding villages. The Victoria Memorial of Kolkata, the Taj Mahal in Agra, the Raudat Tahera in Mumbai and the Jain Temple of Dilwara in southern Rajasthan are built from Makrana marble. Some other monuments where Makrana marble has been used are the Haji Ali Dargah of Mumbai, the Jain Temple of Mysore, and the Ambedkar Park of Lucknow.

Mining
Makrana marble is a metamorphic rock. It is found in a single deposit in India. The Makrana marble has a range of about 90–98% Calcium Carbonate.

Makrana has various mines in the Aravallis range, popularly known as Doongri, Devi, Ulodi, Saabwali, Gulabi, Kumari, Neharkhan, Matabhar, Matabhar Kumari, Chuck Doongri, Chosira and Pahar Kua. The Pahar Kua range is thought to be the actual mine from which the marble for the Taj Mahal was extracted.

The Doongri, Devi, Sahabwali, Ulodi, Chosira and Neharkhan mines are famous for white marble, whereas Ulodi is famous for albeta marble (white marble with dark patterning). The Gulabi mine produces pink plain and pink adana marble, whereas almost all mines produce adanga marble with brown and grey shades. There are about 800 factories for marble cutting and processing. The factories use gang saws to cut the marble.

See also

Victoria Memorial of Kolkata
Taj Mahal
Makrana marble
Nagaur
Marble
Kheri Leela

References

Cities and towns in Nagaur district
Mining communities in India
Marble